Gone West (2012) is a work of detective fiction by Carola Dunn, the twentieth in her series about the Honourable Daisy Dalrymple, a woman in 1920s England who solves mysteries, to the consternation of her police chief husband, Alec Fletcher.

Plot introduction
Daisy Dalrymple is summoned by Sybil Sutherby, an acquaintance from her school days, to Eyrie Farm in Derbyshire, where Sybil works as the secretary to an author of pulp westerns, Humphrey Birtwhistle. Birtwhistle has been ill for the past two years, and in that time Sybil has taken over the actual writing of his novels, an arrangement that has led to increased sales due to Sybil's greater gifts for character and dialogue. However, she has come to suspect that someone in the house might be keeping Humphrey ill through drugging, so as to keep Sybil writing and bringing more money to the farm. Then when Humphrey dies, foul play is suspected, and Daisy begins to investigate as her husband, Chief Inspector Alec Fletcher, is called down from Scotland Yard to take the case.

Characters
Daisy Dalrymple, a wife, mother, and stepmother of aristocratic heritage, who is also a freelance writer
Alec Fletcher, Daisy's husband, a Chief Inspector with Scotland Yard
Sybil Sutherby, a secretary and old acquaintance of Daisy's
Humphrey Birtwhistle, an author of westerns who in his younger years travelled the Old West selling "patent nostrums"
Ruby Birtwhistle, Humphrey's American wife
Simon Birtwhistle, Humphrey and Ruby's son, an aspiring author
Norman Birtwhistle, Humphrey's brother, who manages the farm
Lorna Birtwhistle, who keeps the farmhouse
Myra Olney, a relative of the Birtwhistles, and their charge
Neil Carey, Simon's friend and one of Myra's suitors, an Irish playwright
Walter Ilkton, one of Myra's suitors, an aristocrat
Dr. Knox, Humphrey's personal physician

References

External links
 website for Carola Dunn

2012 American novels
American historical novels
American mystery novels
Novels set in England
Novels set in the 1920s
Minotaur Books books